Taipa is an island in Macau, China.

Taipa may also refer to:
 Taipa Beach, Central Sulawesi, Indonesia
 Taipa-Mangonui, a town in New Zealand
 Taipa River, a river in New Zealand
 Teip, or taipa, a clan organisation of some peoples from the Caucasus
 Rammed earth, or taipa, a building technique

See also 
 Rana longicrus, also known as Taipa frog